The Faculty Of Education is one of the 5 faculties which make up the University of Strathclyde in Glasgow, Scotland. The Faculty itself is split up into the a number of Educational Departments which offer undergraduate and postgraduate courses.

Introduction 

The department was formed in early 1992 when the Jordanhill College of education (the first centre in Europe to train teachers) made the decision to merge with the university in order to create a new department; The new Faculty, which came into being on 1 April 1993, has a history in the field of training new teachers and more recently, in the education  of professionals in the arts, community education, physical education, sport and outdoor education, social work and speech and language therapy. 

Its Jordanhill campus houses the largest education research library in Scotland. There are two student residences on campus. Other facilities include a bank, two shops, a refectory, coffee shops and a student club. 
The University of Strathclyde plan to close the Jordanhill campus in 2012, and move the faculty into Glasgow City Centre onto the John Anderson Campus, which it The University's main location.

Departments 

 Childhood & Primary studies
 Aesthetic and creative studies
 Curricular Studies
 Education & Professional studies
 Glasgow school of social work
 Culture, sports and the Arts

Undergraduate Courses 

  BA (Hons) in Applied Music
  BA (Hons) in Community Arts
  BA (Hons) in Community Education
  BA in Childhood Practice (p/t)
  BA in Education and Social Services
  BSc (Hons) in Sport and Physical Activity
  BA (Hons)  in Social Work
  BA (Hons) in Social Work (including Residential Child Care Option) 
  BEd (Hons) in Primary Education
  BSc (Hons) in Speech and Language Pathology

Postgraduate Courses 

  ATQ in Secondary Education
  EdD - Doctor of Education
  MEd - Master of Education
  Professional Graduate Diploma in Education (Primary) PGDE(P)
  Professional Graduate Diploma in Education (Secondary) PGDE(S)
  MSc/PgD/PgC in Adult Guidance
  PgC/PgD in Advanced Academic Studies
  MSc/PgD/PgC in Advanced Professional Studies
  MSc in Advanced Residential Childcare
  MSc/PgD in Applied Educational Research
  MSc/PgD/PgC in Autism
  MSc/PgD/PgC in Careers Guidance and Development
  MSc/PgD/PgC in Chartered Teacher Studies
  MSc/PgD in Community Care
  PgC in Community Education
  PgC in Counselling Skills
  MSc/PgD in Counselling
  PgC in Design and Technology Education
  MSc/PgD/PgC in Early Childhood Studies
  MSc/PgD/PgC in Educational Support
  PgD/PgC in Enterprise in Education
  PgC in Educational Computing
  MSc/PgD in Equality and Discrimination
  PgC in Maths Recovery
  MSc/PgD/PgC in Management and Leadership in Education 
  PgD/PgC in Person-Centred Counselling (Athens)
  MSc/PgD/PgC in Play Therapy
  MSc/PgC/D in Safety & Risk Management
  PgD in School Leadership and Management (SQH)
  PgC/PgD/MSc in Social Work Management
  MSc/PgD in Social Work

Research 
The department takes part in ongoing research by assisting staff and students in the various research areas and also by making sure they have been fully trained.
The university has a very large library.

Students in the department may get the chance to take part in an international Student exchange program which means they will be travelling to another university in Europe.  This is due to the department supporting the studying of students in other countries throughout  the world.

National Centre for Autism Studies 
The Faculty is home to the National Centre For Autism studies which was established in 2003.  The NCAS comprises three strandse in relation to autism - research, practice and teaching - with a multi-disciplinary staff and visiting professors.

Childhood and Families
The centre for Childhood and Families Research has been operating in the university since 1999.  Its motto is:

"To enhance the quality of childhood and family experience by working in partnership with parents, professionals and policy makers in order to extend understanding of learning and development in families, communities and children's services."

Department Rankings
The Faculty of Education ranks in the top 5 in Scotland and in the top 20 in the UK.

Faculty Activities
Staff from the Departments which make up the faculty are involved in the teaching of instructional courses at undergraduate and postgraduate level, as well as in personal research and in the supervision of students undertaking higher degrees. Another major activity is the provision of short courses designed for qualified teachers and other professionals which graduate from the department.

References

External links
 Faculty Home Page
 University Homepage
 Over View Of University Of Strathclyde

University of Strathclyde
Teacher training colleges in the United Kingdom